Debo may refer to:

People
 Debo Adedayo (born 1992), Nigerian comedian, actor, and activist, stage name Mr Macaroni
 Debo Adegbile (born 1966), American lawyer
 Debo Adeyewa, Nigerian academic, administrator and author
 Debo Prasad Barooah, Indian academician, author, historian and former university administrator
 Debo Ogundoyin (born 1987), Nigerian politician
 Debo Powers, American politician and former educator
 "Debo", nickname of Deborah Cavendish, Duchess of Devonshire (1920–2014), English aristocrat, writer, memoirist and socialite
 Angie Debo (1890–1988), American historian
 W. Alfred Debo (1877–1960), American football player and coach, lawyer and politician

Other uses
 Lake Débo, Mali
 Débo Club de Mopti, a football club based in Mopti, Mali

See also
 Debo Band
 Deebo (disambiguation)

Masculine given names